The 1987 Matchroom Professional Championship was the second edition of the professional invitational snooker tournament which took place between 4 and 7 November 1987 in Southend-on-Sea, England.

The tournament featured seven professional players, all part of Barry Hearn's Matchroom Sport stable. The tournament was won by Dennis Taylor, who defeated reigning champion Willie Thorne 10–3 in the final.

Dennis Taylor beat Steve Davis 6–3 in the semi-finals after trailing 1–3.

Tournament draw

References

Matchroom Professional Championship
Matchroom Professional Championship
Matchroom Professional Championship
Matchroom Professional Championship